Heinz Reinefarth (26 December 1903 – 7 May 1979) was a German SS commander during World War II and government official in West Germany after the war. During the Warsaw Uprising of August 1944 his troops committed numerous atrocities. After the war, Reinefarth became the mayor of the town of Westerland, on the isle of Sylt, and member of the Schleswig-Holstein Landtag. Polish demands for extradition were never accepted, and Reinefarth was never convicted of any war crime.

Early years
Reinefarth was born in Gnesen (Gniezno), Province of Posen. After finishing the gymnasium in 1922, he studied law at the University of Jena. He became a member of the student fraternity Landsmannschaft Suevia Jena (this was the origin of the "Schmiss" – German for "dueling scar" – on his left cheek). He graduated in 1927 and passed the 1st degree state exams. Until 1930 he completed his application at the local court in Jena and was promoted to judge. On 1 August 1932, he joined the NSDAP and received party identification card 1,268,933. In December of the same year, he joined the SS.

World War II
Shortly before the outbreak of World War II, Reinefarth was conscripted as a reserve Feldwebel. For his actions during the invasion of Poland he received the 2nd Class Iron Cross. He took part in the 1940 campaign against France, for which he was awarded the Knight's Cross of the Iron Cross. On 20 April 1942, he was promoted to SS-Brigadeführer, the equivalent of Generalmajor in the Wehrmacht.

After promotion to brigadier, Reinefarth was appointed as General Inspector of SS in the Protectorate of Bohemia-Moravia. In September 1943, he was transferred to Berlin where he served in the Ministry of Order Police (Hauptamt Ordnungspolizei). On 29 January 1944, Reinefarth was assigned to be SS and Police Leader in Reichsgau Wartheland (Polish Poznań Voivodeship annexed by Germany in 1939).

Warsaw uprising
After the outbreak of the Warsaw Uprising, Reinefarth was ordered to organise a military unit consisting of personnel from various security units and head for Warsaw. Upon arrival, his forces (Kampfgruppe Reinefarth) were included in the Korpsgruppe von dem Bach of General Erich von dem Bach-Zelewski who was ordered by Heinrich Himmler to quell the rebellion. From 5 August 1944, Reinefarth's group took part in mass murders in the undefended Wola area.

Murder of civilians

In two days, the units of Reinefarth, which included the notorious SS-Sturmbrigade Dirlewanger under SS-Oberführer Oskar Dirlewanger, murdered approximately 60,000 civilian inhabitants of Warsaw in what is known as the Wola massacre. In one of his reports to the commander of the German 9th Army Reinefarth stated that "we have more prisoners than ammunition to kill them". After securing the Wola area, his troops took part in heavy fighting against the Armia Krajowa in the Old Town. In September, his forces were transferred to attack the boroughs of Powiśle and Czerniaków, where they committed further atrocities, including killing of POWs and wounded found in military hospitals. In all 150,000–200,000 Polish civilians were killed during the uprising. For his actions during the Warsaw Uprising Reinefarth was awarded the Oak Leaves to his Knight's Cross of the Iron Cross on 30 September 1944.

Later war activity
In November 1944, Reinefarth was given command over the XIV SS Corps on the Upper-Rhine and in December 1944 over the XVIII SS Corps in the central Oder river area. Between January and March 1945, he commanded the defence of "Festung Küstrin" (Kostrzyn nad Odrą). He declined to defend it to the last man and Hitler found fault with the way he withdrew his troops. Himmler, acting on Hitler's order, had Reinefarth arrested at the end of March 1945. Later he was sentenced to death by a military court. However, the sentence was not carried out, and he continued to command those of his troops that managed to leave the fortress. He moved his troops to the west and surrendered to the British.

Postwar
After World War II, the Polish communist authorities demanded his extradition. However, the British and American authorities of occupied West Germany decided that Reinefarth could be useful as a witness at the Nuremberg Trial. After the trials, he was arrested for war crimes, but the local court in Hamburg released him shortly afterwards on the grounds of lack of evidence. West German courts ruled that depositions were not sufficient to secure his conviction and also that genocide was not in the criminal code of Nazi Germany and so could not be applied retroactively.

Reinefarth went on to live a normal life. In December 1951, he was elected mayor of the town of Westerland, the main town on the island of Sylt. In 1962, he was elected to the parliament (Landtag) of Schleswig-Holstein. After his term ended in 1967, he worked as a lawyer. Despite numerous demands by Communist Poland, he was not extradited as the German courts had ruled that there was no evidence of him committing any crimes. He was considered not guilty in the eyes of the law and the federal government. He received a general's pension upon retirement. He died on 7 May 1979 in his mansion on Sylt.

Legacy
In 2014, the local authorities of Westerland raised a memorial table remembering Polish victims of Reinefarth. A local SPD member, Ernst Wilhelm Sojan, who was present at the ceremony had campaigned since the 1960s to raise awareness of acts committed by Reinefarth but said that he was always met with a "wall of silence". The regional Schleswig-Holstein government issued a special statement expressing regret that Heinz Reinefarth had been allowed to work as politician in the region. Polish President Bronislaw Komorowski praised the authorities of Sylt for attempting to deal with its past.

Awards
 Iron Cross (1939) 2nd Class (25 September 1939) & 1st Class (28 May 1940)
 Knight's Cross of the Iron Cross with Oak Leaves
 Knight's Cross on 25 June 1940
 608th Oak Leaves on 30 September 1944 as SS-Gruppenführer and Generalleutnant of the Police, and commander of a Kampfgruppe in the Korpsgruppe von dem Bach

Films
"Holiday on Sylt" 1957 by the Eastern German film director Andrew Thorndike

See also

List SS-Gruppenführer
Planned destruction of Warsaw

References

Citations

Bibliography

 
 
Tebinka, Jacek. "Ciche lata kata",  Polityka - nr 32 (2362),  2002-08-10; page 66.

External links 

 Wola '44 – genocide in Warsaw - collection of civilian testimonies concerning Reinefarth's group activity during Warsaw Uprising 

1903 births
1979 deaths
People from Gniezno
Nazi Party politicians
All-German Bloc/League of Expellees and Deprived of Rights politicians
Holocaust perpetrators in Poland
People from the Province of Posen
Recipients of the Knight's Cross of the Iron Cross with Oak Leaves
SS and Police Leaders
Academic staff of the University of Jena
Warsaw Uprising German forces
Waffen-SS personnel
SS-Gruppenführer
Members of the Landtag of Schleswig-Holstein
20th-century Freikorps personnel